Medical & Biological Engineering & Computing is a monthly peer-reviewed medical journal and an official publication of the International Federation of Medical and Biological Engineering. It is published by Springer Science+Business Media. It covers research in biomedical engineering and bioengineering. It was established as a bimonthly publication in 1963 under the title Medical Electronics & Biological Engineering. It publishes Original Research Articles, Reviews, and Technical Notes.

External links 
 
 11th Mediterranean Conference on Medical and Biological Engineering and Computing – the MEDICON 2007 - 
 The 12th Mediterranean Conference on Medical and Biological Engineering and Computing – MEDICON 2010 - 
 International Congress of students and young doctors (bio)medicine in Bosnia and Herzegovina "Medicon" - 
 Systems Medicine for the Delivery of Better Healthcare Services – MEDICON 2016 - 
 2017 MEDICON conference in Croatia - 

English-language journals
Publications established in 1963
Springer Science+Business Media academic journals
Biomedical informatics journals
Monthly journals